Men's freestyle wrestling competition began in the Olympics in 1904. The World Wrestling Championships for men's freestyle wrestling first began in 1951. The World Wrestling Championships takes place during non Olympic years. At the World Wrestling Championships team scoring is kept, while no official team standings are kept for the Olympics.

World Level Champions in Men's Freestyle Wrestling by Year and Weight

1904

1908

1920

1924–1936

1948–1968

1969–1996

1997–2001

2002–2013

2014–2017

2018–2019

2021

2021–2022

Individual Multiple-Time World Level Champions

10 World Level Championships

 Aleksandr Medved, 1962–1972

9 World Level Championships

 Buvaisar Saitiev, 1995–2008

8 World Level Championships

 Sergei Beloglazov, 1980–1988

  Arsen Fadzaev, 1983–1992

 Valentin Yordanov, 1983–1996

7 World Level Championships

  Makharbek Khadartsev, 1986–1992

 Abdulrashid Sadulaev, 2014–2021

 Jordan Burroughs, 2011–2022

6 World Level Championships

 Abdollah Movahed, 1965–1970

 Levan Tediashvili, 1971–1976

 Soslan Andiyev, 1973–1980

 John Smith, 1987–1992

    Leri Khabelov, 1985–1993

 Khadzhimurat Gatsalov, 2004–2013

5 World Level Championships

 Mustafa Dağıstanlı, 1954–1960

 Aleksandr Ivanitsky, 1962–1966

 Ali Aliev, 1959–1967

 Yuji Takada, 1974–1979

 Vladimir Yumin, 1974–1979

 Bruce Baumgartner, 1984–1995

Team Championships
The list below includes unofficial championships won during the Olympic Games, although no official team statistics are kept during Olympic years.

47 World Level Championships
 /  /  /  //  1959–2021

9 World Level Championships
 1904–2022

7 World Level Championships
 1948–1994

6 World Level Championships
 /  /  1956–2013

2 World Level Championships
 1920–1928

 1964–1968

1 World Level Championship
 1908

 1936

 1952

 2003

See also

List of Cadet, Junior, and Espoir World Champions in men's freestyle wrestling
United States results in men's freestyle wrestling
Soviet and Russian results in men's freestyle wrestling
Iranian results in men's freestyle wrestling
List of World and Olympic Champions in Greco-Roman wrestling
List of World and Olympic Champions in women's freestyle wrestling

References
FILA Wrestling Database

Freestyle wrestling
Wrestling champions
Wrestling